The Philippine Senate Committee on Youth is a standing committee of the Senate of the Philippines.

This committee, along with the Committee on Women, Children, Family Relations and Gender Equality, was formed after the Committee on Youth, Women and Family Relations was split into two on September 2, 2013, pursuant to Senate Resolution No. 6 during the 16th Congress.

Jurisdiction 
According to the Rules of the Senate, the committee handles all matters relating to:

 The youth and its vital role in nation-building
 Promotion and protection of their physical, moral, spiritual, intellectual, and social well-being
 Inculcation of patriotism, nationalism and their involvement in public and civic affairs

Members, 18th Congress 
Based on the Rules of the Senate, the Senate Committee on Youth has 7 members.

The President Pro Tempore, the Majority Floor Leader, and the Minority Floor Leader are ex officio members.

Here are the members of the committee in the 18th Congress as of September 24, 2020:

Committee secretary: Gemma Genoveva G. Tanpiengco

See also 

 List of Philippine Senate committees

References 

Youth
Youth in the Philippines